The Crossmen Drum and Bugle Corps is a World Class competitive junior drum and bugle corps, based in San Antonio, Texas. The Crossmen are a member corps of Drum Corps International (DCI).

History
The Crossmen Drum and Bugle Corps was founded on October 1, 1974, through the merger of two suburban Philadelphia drum and bugle corps: the Keystone Regiment and the 507 Hornets. The name "Crossmen" was chosen, from a list of 43 proposed names, by the members of the new corps in recognition of American Legion Post 507, which was named in honor of World War I veteran John Wesley Cross. Beginning in Delaware County, Pennsylvania, the corps has, over the years, been based in several other communities. Their longest stays were in West Chester, Pennsylvania and Newark, Delaware.

The Crossmen were competitively successful from the start, winning the Eastern States Circuit Championship from 1975 to 1981. In 1977, the corps won the American Legion National Junior Drum and Bugle Corps Championship in Denver, Colorado. In 1981, they won the Veterans of Foreign Wars Nationals in Philadelphia.

In the winter of 1996, on the verge of folding, the corps became one of the programs sponsored by Youth Education in the Arts (YEA!), an organization which also included The Cadets Drum and Bugle Corps and the United States Scholastic Band Association. As a member of YEA!, the corps was based in Allentown, Pennsylvania. After the 2006 season, the corps relocated to San Antonio and then separated from YEA! in late August 2007.

The Crossmen have been Drum Corps International finalists a total of 29 times between 1977 and 2019.

Show summary (1972–2022) 
Source:

References

External links
Official website

Drum and bugle corps
Drum Corps International World Class corps
Musical groups from San Antonio
Musical groups established in 1974
1974 establishments in Pennsylvania